Biere may refer to:

Biere, Germany, a village in the district of Salzlandkreis in Saxony-Anhalt in Germany
Bière, a town in the canton of Vaud in Switzerland
Walter Biere, English Member of Parliament
Robert Biere, English Member of Parliament